The fungal genus Truncatella in the family Sporocadaceae, and in the Amphisphaeriales order, includes plant pathogens such as Truncatella laurocerasi.

Truncatella angustata has been linked with grapevine trunk disease in northern Iran. Neopestalotiopsis, Pestalotiopsis and Truncatella fungal species (all in family Sporocadaceae) are associated with grapevine trunk diseases in France.
It also causes canker and twig dieback in blueberry plants.

Species
As accepted by Species Fungorum;

Truncatella angustata 
Truncatella bella 
Truncatella betulae 
Truncatella conorum-piceae 
Truncatella excelsa 
Truncatella hartigii 
Truncatella helichrysi 
Truncatella laurocerasi 
Truncatella megaspora 
Truncatella tianshanica 
Truncatella truncata 
Truncatella vitalbae 
Truncatella wangikarii 

Former species;
 T. pampeana  = [[Pestalotiopsis pampeana); Pestalotiopsidaceae
 T. pestalozzioides  = Pestalotiopsis pestalozzioides, Pestalotiopsidaceae
 T. pitospora  = Pestalotia pitospora, Pestalotiopsidaceae
 T. ramulosa  = Truncatella laurocerasi]], Bartaliniaceae
 T. restionacearum  = Heterotruncatella restionacearum, Sporocadaceae
 T. spadicea  = Heterotruncatella spadicea, Sporocadaceae
 T. spartii  = Heterotruncatella spartii, Sporocadaceae
 T. suffocata  = Pestalotiopsis suffocata, Pestalotiopsidaceae
 T. trevoae  = Chrysalidopsis trevoae'', Ascomycota

References 

Fungal plant pathogens and diseases
Xylariales